Szczawin may refer to the following places in Poland:
Szczawin, Lower Silesian Voivodeship (south-west Poland)
Szczawin, Łódź Voivodeship (central Poland)
Szczawin, Płońsk County in Masovian Voivodeship (east-central Poland)
Szczawin, Ostrołęka County in Masovian Voivodeship (east-central Poland)